The Ongerup Branch railway, also known as the Tambellup, Gnowangrup to Ongerup railway is a former railway in Western Australia.

The  Tambellup to Ongerup branch line from the Great Southern Railway main line between Perth and Albany was opened to Gnowangerup on 1 July 1912, and finally through to Ongerup on 6 January 1913.
The line was developed to provide direct access for the expanding wheat production area to the port at Albany. The line was authorised for construction under the Tambellup-Ongerup Railway Act 1911.
A timetable from 1937 shows two trains per week leaving Ongerup on Tuesdays at 06:55 and Fridays at 04:00. Lengthy connections of around 12 hours were available at Katanning for Perth, arriving approximately 30 hours after leaving Ongerup.

The line went via Tambellup, Dartnall, Toolbrunup, Pallinup, Gnowangerup, Formby, Kebaringup, Borden, Laurier, Toompup and Ongerup. Water supply for the trains was provided at Formby.

In 1918 a barracks was constructed on Eldridge Street for railway workers based in Ongerup. The building survived the closure of the railway and now houses the Ongerup and Needilup District Museum, opened in 1978.

In 1986 the Gnowangerup Railway Station building was closed as a working station and remained unused until 2000, when it was dismantled and moved to the Lily Vineyard, near Borden, where it was rebuilt in 2003 as a restaurant.

The section of line from Gnowangerup to Ongerup was closed on 13 October 1957. The Tambellup to Gnowangerup section was closed in July 2007.

Named locations on line
 Tambellup (252 miles)
 Dartnall (257 miles)
 Toolbrunup (264 miles)
 Pallinup (269 miles)
 Gnowangerup (276 miles)
 Fornby (281 miles)
 Kebaringup (287 miles)
 Borden (295 miles)
 Laurier (300 miles)
 Toompup (306 miles)
 Ongerup (311 miles)

Notes 

Great Southern (Western Australia)
Closed railway lines in Western Australia
Railway lines opened in 1913
Railway lines closed in 1957
Former Western Australian Government Railways railway lines
1913 establishments in Australia